William Rayburn Cadwallader (1931 – March 31, 2016) was a  member of the Ohio House of Representatives.

References

Republican Party members of the Ohio House of Representatives
1931 births
2016 deaths